Félix Pineda Flores (born in El Salvador) is a retired Salvadoran footballer.

Club career
Nicknamed La Garrobita, Pineda played for Águila in the Barraza's Kinder Era in the middle of the 1970s.

International career
Pineda played for the El Salvador national football team, appearing in 3 qualifying matches for the 1978 FIFA World Cup and 1 for the 1974 FIFA World Cup

References

External links
 “La camisola de Águila pesa” - Aguilucho Mayor 

Year of birth missing (living people)
Living people
Association football forwards
Salvadoran footballers
El Salvador international footballers
C.D. Águila footballers